Voss v. Fisher, 113 U.S. 213 (1885), was a patent case regarding neck-pads for horses.   These pads were of various kinds and had been in use well before the patent application was filed. The pads were attached to a horse collar at its upper end, right below where the two arms of the collar are buckled together. They rested on the neck of the horse, and their object was to prevent the galling of the horse's neck by the upper part of the collar. The improvement in neck-pads covered by the letters patent is described as follows:

The invention relates to a new device for protecting the necks of horses between the upper ends of the collar to prevent galling. For this purpose pieces of leather, cloth, or other material have heretofore been used, but without the desired success. Pads could not be made, as their inner faces could not be kept clear from wrinkles or protuberances, which are more injurious than the omission of a protecting device. My invention consists in producing a pad which may be attached to the collar, and which is perfectly smooth on the under side, the leather used on the under side being crimped in order to obtain the desired shape. The pad is so shaped that if fits a horse's neck between the arms of the collar, it being thick on top and tapering to wards the ends. The under side of the pad is formed by a sheet of leather, which is crimped in order to have its ends turned up without producing wrinkles; the stuffing in the pad is of hay, or any other suitable material. On the outer side of the pad, near the ends of the same, are straps which are fitted around the collar to prevent longitudinal displacement of the pad.' The claim was as follows: 'The neck- pad having an inner lining of crimped leather, and provided with straps to allow its being fastened to the collar as herein shown and described for the purpose specified.

The object charged to infringe on the patent was a single piece of crimped leather with a piece of sheet metal, shaped to fit, riveted to its upper side to stiffen and preserve its crimped form, with straps attached to fasten it to the collar. The specification of the patent describes a stuffed pad. The illustrative drawing shows a stuffed pad, and the certified model of the invention from the patent-office, exhibited at the hearing, is a stuffed pad.

"It is clear that if the patent is to be construed as a combination consisting of a stuffed pad, having an inner lining of crimped leather and straps to fasten the pad to the collar, the appellant does not infringe, for he does not use one of the elements of the combination, namely, the stuffed pad, nor its equivalent." [113 U.S. 213, 215]

See also
List of United States Supreme Court cases, volume 113

References

External links
 

United States Supreme Court cases
United States Supreme Court cases of the Waite Court
United States patent case law
1885 in United States case law
Horse tack